Kaiser-i-Hind is a civilian award of the British Raj.

Kaiser-i-Hind may also refer to:
 Emperor of India (Kaiser-i-Hind), originally derived from Roman title Caesar
 Kaiser-e-Hind (monument), Punjab, India
 Teinopalpus aureus, a butterfly commonly known as the golden Kaiser-i-Hind
 Teinopalpus imperialis, a swallowtail butterfly commonly known as the Kaiser-i-Hind